Maropene Ramokgopa (born 1979 or 1980) is a South African politician who is the Minister in the Presidency responsible for Planning, Monitoring and Evaluation, in office since March 2023. She has been the Second Deputy Secretary-General of the African National Congress (ANC) since December 2022 and a Member of the National Assembly of South Africa since February 2023. She is also the coordinator of the interim task team that was appointed in June 2022 to lead the ANC Women's League. She formerly served as a special advisor to President Cyril Ramaphosa.

Early life and career 
Ramokgopa was born in Limpopo province in 1979 or 1980. A former student activist, she was appointed executive mayor of a Northern Cape district municipality in 2006; she was only 26 at the time. She was elected to the National Executive Committee of the African National Congress (ANC) Women's League (ANCWL) in 2008 and, under ANCWL President Angie Motshekga, held a managerial position in the league and convened its Young Women's Desk. She was also on the National Executive Committee of the ANC Youth League and was appointed to an interim task team which led the Youth League after its leadership corps was disbanded by the mainstream ANC in 2013.

Ramokgopa later served on the board of the National Youth Development Agency. In 2016, President Jacob Zuma appointed her as South African Consul-General to Mumbai, India. Upon her return to South Africa, President Cyril Ramaphosa appointed her his special advisor on international relations in the Presidency, initially as his chief advisor at the African Union. In October 2021, she was one of five special envoys appointed by Ramaphosa to engage with King Mswati during pro-democracy protests in neighbouring Eswatini.

She was elected to the Provincial Executive Committee of the Limpopo branch of the ANC in 2022. In late June 2022, the ANC National Executive Committee appointed her coordinator of the interim task team of the ANCWL; in this capacity she, alongside task team convenor Baleka Mbete, will lead the league until it elects a new leadership corps.

Election as Deputy Secretary-General 
Ahead of the ANC's 55th National Conference, Ramokgopa was viewed as a supporter of Ramaphosa's campaign for re-election as ANC President and as a key member of the so-called "women's caucus" within the pro-Ramaphosa camp. In September 2022, the pro-Ramaphosa Provincial Executive Committee of the Northern Cape ANC endorsed Ramokgopa as a candidate for Deputy Secretary-General of the party. She was not initially included on the list of candidates but once the conference began in December 2022, the party resolved to create a new Second Deputy Secretary-General position; Ramokgopa was nominated from the floor of the conference to fill the post.

On 19 December, she won the election for Second Deputy Secretary-General, earning 2,373 votes against the 1,948 received by Ronalda Nalumango. She serves alongside First Deputy Secretary-General Nomvula Mokonyane and under Secretary-General Fikile Mbalula.

National government
On 5 February 2023, it was reported that Ramokgopa was one of four senior ANC member who would be sworn in as a member of the National Assembly the following day. Ramokgopa was sworn in as a Member of Parliament on 6 February 2023 alongside ANC Deputy President Paul Mashatile and ANC NEC members Sihle Zikalala and Parks Tau.

Ramokgopa was appointed as Minister in the Presidency responsible for Planning, Monitoring and Evaluation during a cabinet reshuffle on 6 March 2023. She was sworn into office the following day.

References 

People from Limpopo
African National Congress politicians
Living people
Year of birth uncertain
Year of birth missing (living people)
Members of the National Assembly of South Africa
Women members of the National Assembly of South Africa
Women government ministers of South Africa
Government ministers of South Africa